Vinderei is a commune in Vaslui County, Western Moldavia, Romania. It is composed of eight villages: Brădești, Docani, Docăneasa, Gara Docăneasa, Gara Tălășman, Obârșeni, Valea Lungă and Vinderei.

References

Communes in Vaslui County
Localities in Western Moldavia